Fort Philip Long is a historic fort complex located on the Shenandoah River near Stanley, Page County, Virginia. It is a significant example of the fortifications undertaken by the families in the Massanutten country of Page County in the later half of the 18th century. It includes an 18th-century, 1 1/2-story, rubble limestone structure with a gable roof.  It sits on an basement and features a massive exterior asymmetrical stone chimney.  The fort is situated about 100 yards from the stone dwelling.  It consists of random rubble limestone walls that form a tall barrel vault pierced by loopholes. The fort may also be entered by means of a tunnel, sunk into the limestone, running from the basement of the stone house.  Also on the property is a large brick three-bay square house built in 1856 and a stone slave quarter.

It was listed on the National Register of Historic Places in 1973.

References

Buildings and structures in Page County, Virginia
National Register of Historic Places in Page County, Virginia
Philip Long
Philip Long